The Betrayal is a Thai drama television series adapted from the British TV series Doctor Foster, starring Ann Thongprasom, Ananda Everingham and Patricia Tanchanok Good, with Chatayodom Hiranyasthiti and Rinlanee Sripen. Prepare to broadcast on Channel 3 HD.

Cast 
 Ann Thongprasom as Dr. Janepitcha Pattanakit, MD.
 Ananda Everingham as Athin
 Patricia Tanchanok Good as Kate

References

Doctor Foster
Thai drama television series
Upcoming television series